Ekta Sohini is an Indian actress and the wife of the actor Mohnish Bahl. After several small 1980s television roles, she made her film debut opposite Arbaaz Ali Khan in the coming-of-age romance film Solah Satra (1990) and starred as Aditya Pancholi's love interest in Naamcheen (1991) and Tahalka (1992). Her daughter Pranutan Bahl is also an actress.

Filmography
 Solah Satra (1990)
 Awwal Number (1990) 
 Paap Ki Kamaee (1990)
 Picchi Pulliah (Telugu 1991) 
 Fateh  (1991)
 Naamcheen (1991)
 Hafta Bandh (1991)
 Saajan (1991)
 Khatra (1991)
 Vansh (1992)
 Yudhpath (1992)
 Tahalka (1992)
 Basanti Tangewali (1992)
 Shatranj (1993)
 Nazar Ke Samne (1995)
 Hasina Aur Nagina (1996)
 Talaashi (1996)
 Vaastav (1999)
 Gang (2000) 
 Vaah! Life Ho Toh Aisi! (2005)
 Aman Ke Farishtey (2016)

Television shows
Dill Mill Gayye as Padma Bansal Gupta
Itihaas as aunt Sheila Devi
Sanjeevani 2 as Roshni Mathur
Murder She Wrote season 2 Episode one as Desk Clerk

References

External links
 
 

Actresses in Hindi cinema
Indian film actresses
Living people
Actresses in Hindi television
Indian television actresses
20th-century Indian actresses
1971 births